Eucalyptus ewartiana, commonly known as Ewart's mallee, is a species of mallee that is endemic to Western Australia. It has reddish brown, minni ritchi bark, narrow lance-shaped to egg-shaped adult leaves, flower buds in groups of seven, white flowers and conical to hemispherical fruit.

Description
Flowering occurs between August and February and the flowers are white.

Taxonomy and naming
Eucalyptus ewartiana was first formally described in 1919 by Joseph Maiden from a specimen he collected near Pindar in 1909. The description was published in Journal and Proceedings of the Royal Society of New South Wales. The specific epithet (ewartiana) honours Alfred James Ewart.

Distribution and habitat
Ewart's mallee is found on sandplains and among granite outcrops and is spread throughout the Mid West, Wheatbelt, Pilbara and Goldfields-Esperance regions of Western Australia where it grows in loamy-sandy soils.

Conservation status
This eucalypt is classified as "not threatened" by the Western Australian Government Department of Parks and Wildlife.

See also
List of Eucalyptus species

References

ewartiana
Endemic flora of Western Australia
Mallees (habit)
Myrtales of Australia
Eucalypts of Western Australia
Plants described in 1919
Taxa named by Joseph Maiden